Rica may refer to:

Organizations 
Rica Hotels,  a chain of approx. 90 hotels located in Norway and Sweden, including:
Grand Hotel (Oslo)
Holmenkollen Park Hotel Rica
Rica Hotel, Kungsgatan
Rica Seilet Hotel (Molde)
Rica Talk Hotel (Älvsjö)

People 
Doña Rica, otherwise known as Richeza of Poland, Queen of Castile
Rica Erickson (born 1908), an Australian naturalist, botanical artist, historian, and author
Rica Matsumoto (born  1968), a Japanese actress
Rica Peralejo (born 1981), a Filipina actress, singer, and television host
Vítor Riça (born 1974), Portuguese footballer
Rui Riça (born 1978), Portuguese footballer

Acronym (RICA) 
Regulation of Interception of Communications and Provision of Communication-related Information Act, 2002, a South African law regulating the interception of communications
Regional Institute for Children and Adolescents, part of Montgomery County Public Schools (Maryland)
Rupture of Intracranial aneurysm

See also
Costa Rica
Rika (disambiguation)